Giuseppe Palumbo (born 10 September 1975 in Syracuse) is an Italian racing cyclist. Palumbo became Junior World Champion in the road race twice, in 1992 and 1993.

Palumbo rode the Giro d'Italia in 1998, 1999, 2000, 2003, 2007 and 2009, but never won a stage.

Palmarès 

 Tour de Wallonie - 1 stage (2007)
 Giro della Liguria - 1 stage (2003)
 Grand Prix of Aargau Canton (2002)
 World U19 Road Championship (1992–1993)
 Italian U17 Road Championship (1991)

Notes and references

Italian male cyclists
1975 births
Living people
People from Syracuse, Sicily
Sportspeople from the Province of Syracuse
Cyclists from Sicily